1924 Országos Bajnokság I (men's water polo) was the 18th water polo championship in Hungary. There were seven teams who played one-round match for the title.

Final list 

* M: Matches W: Win D: Drawn L: Lost G+: Goals earned G-: Goals got P: Point

2. Class 

1. UTE 4, 2. MTK 2, 3. BEAC 0 pont.

Sources 
Gyarmati Dezső: Aranykor (Hérodotosz Könyvkiadó és Értékesítő Bt., Budapest, 2002.)
Sport-évkönyv 1924
Sporthírlap 1924.09.15.

1924 in water polo
1924 in Hungarian sport
Seasons in Hungarian water polo competitions